The participation of Kyrgyzstan in the ABU TV Song Festival has occurred twice since the inaugural ABU TV Song Festival began in 2012. Since their début in 2013, the Kyrgyz entry has been organised by the national broadcaster New Broadcasting Network (HTC). In 2019, Kyrgyzstan withdrew from the festival.

History
KTRK made their debut in the ABU TV Song Festivals at the 2013 festival, in Hanoi, Vietnam.

Withdrawal
Kyrgyzstan was not present on the final participation list that was published by the ABU. The reasons for withdrawal from the ABU TV Song Festival 2014 are unknown.

Participation overview

See also 
 Kyrgyzstan in the Türkvizyon Song Contest

References 

Countries at the ABU Song Festival